Tattershall railway station was a station in Tattershall, Lincolnshire. It was closed in 1963. It is now an art gallery.

References

External links
 Detailed account on Disused Stations web site

Disused railway stations in Lincolnshire
Former Great Northern Railway stations
Railway stations in Great Britain opened in 1848
Railway stations in Great Britain closed in 1963